Agros2D is an open-source code for numerical solutions of 2D coupled problems in technical disciplines. Its principal part is a user interface serving for complete preprocessing and postprocessing of the tasks (it contains sophisticated tools for building geometrical models and input of data, generators of meshes, tables of weak forms for the partial differential equations and tools for evaluating results and drawing graphs and maps). The processor is based on the library Hermes containing the most advanced numerical algorithms for monolithic and fully adaptive solution of systems of generally nonlinear and nonstationary partial differential equations (PDEs) based on hp-FEM (adaptive finite element method of higher order of accuracy). Both parts of the code are written in C++.

Features 
 Coupled Fields - With coupled field feature you can blend two or more physical fields in one problem. Weak or hard coupling options are available.
 Nonlinear Problems - Simulation and analysis of nonlinear problems are available. Agros2D now implements both Newton’s and Pickard’s methods.
 Automatic space and time adaptivity - One of the main strengths of the Hermes library is an automatic space adaptivity algorithm. With Agros2D is also possible use adaptive time stepping for transient phenomena analysis. It can significantly improve solution speed without decreasing accuracy.
 Curvilinear Elements - Curvilinear elements is an effective feature for meshing curved geometries and leads to faster and more accurate calculations.
 Quadrilateral Meshing - Quadrilateral meshing can be very useful for some types of problem geometry such as compressible and incompressible flow.
 Particle Tracing—Powerful environment for computing the trajectory of charged particles in electromagnetic field, including the drag force or their reflection on the boundaries.

Highlights of capabilities 
 Higher-order finite element method (hp-FEM) with h, p and hp adaptivity based on reference solution and local projections
 Time-adaptive capabilities for transient problems
 Multimesh assembling over component-specific meshes without projections or interpolations in multi-physics problems
 Parallelization on single machine using OpenMP
 Large range of linear algebra libraries (MUMPS, UMFPACK, PARALUTION, Trilinos)
 Support for scripting in Python (advanced IDE PythonLab)

Physical Fields 
 Electrostatics
 Electric currents (steady state and harmonic)
 Magnetic field (steady state, harmonic and transient)
 Heat transfer (steady state and transient)
 Structural mechanics and thermoelasticity
 Acoustics (harmonic and transient)
 Incompressible flow (steady state and transient)
 RF field (TE and TM waves)
 Richards equation (steady state and transient)

Couplings 
 Current field as a source for heat transfer through Joule losses
 Magnetic field as a source for heat transfer through Joule losses
 Heat distribution as a source for thermoelastic field

History 
The software started from work at the hp-FEM Group at University of West Bohemia in 2009. The first public version was released at the beginning of year 2010. Agros2D has been used in many publications.

See also 
 Hermes
 List of numerical analysis software
 List of finite element software packages
 Open source hp-FEM codes

References

External links 

 Group's website 

Numerical software
Scientific simulation software
Finite element software for Linux
Computer-aided engineering software for Linux
Engineering_software_that_uses_Qt
University of West Bohemia